SAP StreamWork is an enterprise collaboration tool from SAP SE released in March 2010, and sunset in December 2015. StreamWork allows real-time collaboration like Google Wave, but focuses on business activities such as analyzing data, planning meetings, and making decisions. It incorporates technology from Box.net and Evernote to allow users to connect to online files and documents, and document-reader technology from Scribd to allow users to view documents directly within its environment.

StreamWork supports the OpenSocial set of application programming interfaces (APIs), allowing it to connect to tools built by third-party developers, such as Google Docs. A version of StreamWork intended for large enterprises uses a virtual appliance based on Novell's  SUSE Linux Enterprise to connect it to business systems, including those from SAP.

See also
 Apache Wave

References 

SAP SE
Cloud applications
Groupware
Web applications